Surinder Singh Bakhshi (born 1937) is a British writer and physician, who in 1977 was appointed medical officer of environmental health to the Birmingham Area Health Authority, where he led the successful contact tracing and quarantine effort in the community during the 1978 smallpox outbreak in the United Kingdom.

Bakhshi received his medical degree from Makerere University in Kampala, Uganda. After completing house jobs he worked at a hospital by the Zambezi in Zambia, before moving to the United States, where he held a Rockefeller Fellowship in public health at the University of Michigan. In 1974, after a medical posting that involved managing an outbreak of cholera among refugees from Mozambique, he moved to England and in 1977 was interviewed for a medical officer appointment in Birmingham. In addition to his efforts in containing smallpox, he dealt with other outbreaks in Birmingham including hepatitis A, hepatitis B, meningitis and typhoid.

In retirement, Bakhshi published Tuberculosis in the United Kingdom: A tale of two nations (2006) and Sikhs in the Diaspora: A modern guide to the practice of Sikh Faith. A knowledge compendium for the global age (2008).

Early life and education

Surinder Singh Bakhshi, known as Surinderjit to his friends, was born in 1937 in Dar es Salaam to emigrants from India, Sohan Singh and Amrit Kaur. His family were Punjabi Sikhs and had origins in Ras Koh Hills, Balochistan (British India) (now in Pakistan), and during the interwar years his parents left to work in East Africa.

After spending his early years in Dar es Salaam among a large Indian community, he gained admission to study medicine in 1960 at Makerere University in Kampala, Uganda, from where he graduated in 1965. That year, he married Rajinder Kaur, his childhood sweetheart.

Early career

After completing house jobs Bakhshi's first medical officer post was at a hospital in Mongu, Barotseland. Situated by the Zambezi in Zambia, he treated mostly snakebites and tuberculosis in the Barotse population. After three years there he moved to the United States after a brief period in managing immunisation programmes in the Zambia and then taking a worldwide tour. In the US, he held a Rockefeller Fellowship at the University of Michigan, from where he completed a masters in public health in 1971. On returning to Zambia, he was appointed regional medical officer and became involved in containing a cholera outbreak among refugees from Mozambique.

In 1974, he moved to England, where his parents had already settled, and took up a post as registrar in Kingston upon Thames before becoming senior registrar in Gloucestershire, where he resided at Slimbridge.

Birmingham

In 1977, he was appointed medical officer of environmental health for the Birmingham Area Health Authority. An account of his first year there is given in Mark Pallen's book The Last Days of Smallpox (2018). Bakhshi told him that on the day of the interview, he was told by the reception that "people like him" were not allowed to use the lift so he walked the 13 flights of stairs to his interview in Alpha Tower. He recounted in an oral history and in interviews by Pallen and journalist Sally Williams, that instead of the usual eight interviewers, there was surprise that an Indian had applied for the post and 20 turned up to interview him.

After a two-hour interview in which he was hardly asked any questions as the interviewers spent most of the time asking each other questions, he was asked to wait before being informed that a decision was inconclusive, but when he arrived back home he received a call confirming he got the job. He told Williams that "When I started work, people wouldn’t speak to me – not even my secretary, for a couple of weeks. I used to tell my wife, ‘I feel very sorry for them – they look at me and feel unhappy.’" In that first year in post, he had to deal with an outbreak of hepatitis B originating from an acupuncturist. With his family home in Gloucester, he shared his time between Birmingham in the week and home for weekends. His office was allocated in the University of Birmingham Medical School, along the same corridor as Alasdair Geddes.

1978 smallpox outbreak

In 1978, around a year into his post, Bakhshi was tasked with leading the operational management of public health and containing community spread of smallpox during the smallpox outbreak in Birmingham. He first came to hear of smallpox in Birmingham on 25 August 1978 and the first meeting of the control of smallpox outbreak advisory committee took place that same day. Under the chairmanship of William Nicol, Medical Officer to the Birmingham area, the committee included Henry Bedson and Geddes, in addition to Bakhshi. 

Of the two main tasks of the committee; finding out how smallpox arose in the first place and identifying and containing spread of smallpox in the community, Bakhshi's role, now designated "Outbreaks Liaison Officer", was contact tracing and quarantine, home visits to contacts, vaccinations, and antibody injections. Pallen explains that Bakhshi secured unrestricted funding, the use of three floors of Birmingham's Holiday Inn, the black cab service, food from local restaurants, and the recruitment of around 60 doctors, 40 nurses, 85 environmental health inspectors and associates, six officers for disinfection and near a hundred administrative staff. Health records, media and radio were utilised to pin down almost all contacts and they were isolated within 24 hours. With colleagues, he devised a method of categorising contacts and delegated to them either medical staff, health visitors or others accordingly. Bakhshi took responsibility of visiting and dealing with the closest contacts of Janet Parker, the index case. This included those that Parker lived with and the two family physicians that recently treated her.

It was Bakhshi who informed the World Health Organization in mid-October, seven weeks after the onset of the outbreak, that the outbreak was contained and the alert was lifted. The containment efforts were successful, and the official report on the outbreak would later state:

We would like to record our appreciation of the speed and thoroughness with which Dr Nicol, the area Medical Officer, and his staff and also the staff of the Birmingham University medical School reacted to contain the spread of illness when smallpox had been diagnosed. Their action in dealing with the task of tracing isolating and vaccinating all close contacts of Mrs Parker, and in disinfecting all areas of possible contamination was impressive and contributed considerably to preventing a far wider spread of infection.

During his tenure as medical officer in Birmingham, he was responsible for containing other outbreaks including hepatitis A, meningitis, and typhoid.

Later life

In retirement, Bakhshi published Tuberculosis in the United Kingdom: A tale of two nations (2006) and Sikhs in the Diaspora: A modern guide to the practice of Sikh Faith. A knowledge compendium for the global age (2008).

In Williams' article in the Guardian (2020) during the COVID-19 pandemic on whether the 1978 smallpox outbreak could provide any lessons, Bakhshi's approach was considered personal and locally led, and he explained that "contact tracing and containment are in the genes of any public health doctor."

Selected publications

Articles

Books

Footnotes

References

External links

 
 

1937 births
Living people
20th-century Tanzanian people
21st-century Tanzanian people
20th-century British writers
21st-century British writers
20th-century British medical doctors
British writers
British academics
British Sikhs
Makerere University alumni
People from Dar es Salaam
People from Birmingham, West Midlands
British public health doctors
Sikh writers
Tanzanian people of Indian descent
Tanzanian people of Punjabi descent
Tanzanian expatriates in the United Kingdom
Date of birth missing (living people)